Landrock is a surname. Notable people with the surname include: 

Ernst Heinrich Landrock (1878–1966), German photographer
Heinrich Landrock (1890–1948), German rower
Maria Landrock (1923–1992), German actress
Peter Landrock (born 1948), Danish cryptographer and mathematician